The 1991–92 MetJHL season is the 1st season of the Metro Junior A Hockey League (MetJHL). The 12 teams of the Fullan and Bauer Divisions competed in a 44-game schedule.  The top 6 teams in each division made the playoffs.

The winner of the MetJHL playoffs, the Wexford Raiders, could not proceed further in the National playdowns as the MetJHL was not a member of the Ontario Hockey Association.

Changes
MetJHL promotes itself from Junior B to Junior A.
Henry Carr Crusaders move and become Weston Dukes.
Markham Thunderbirds move and become Thornhill Thunderbirds.

Final standings
Note: GP = Games played; W = Wins; L = Losses; OTL = Overtime losses; SL = Shootout losses; GF = Goals for; GA = Goals against; PTS = Points; x = clinched playoff berth; y = clinched division title; z = clinched conference title

1991-92 MetJHL Playoffs
Preliminary
St. Michael's Buzzers defeated Weston Dodgers 3-games-to-none
Pickering Panthers defeated Wellington Dukes 3-games-to-none
Quarter-final
Muskoka Bears defeated St. Michael's Buzzers 4-games-to-3
Bramalea Blues defeated Richmond Hill Rams 4-games-to-1
Thornhill Thunderbirds defeated Pickering Panthers 4-games-to-none
Wexford Raiders defeated Kingston Voyageurs 4-games-to-1
Semi-final
Bramalea Blues defeated Muskoka Bears 4-games-to-none
Wexford Raiders defeated Thornhill Thunderbirds 4-games-to-2
Final
Wexford Raiders defeated Bramalea Blues 4-games-to-none

Players selected in 1992 NHL Entry Draft
Rd 5 #106	Chris DeRuiter -	Toronto Maple Leafs	(Kingston Voyageurs)
Rd 10 #220	Anson Carter -	Quebec Nordiques	(Wexford Raiders)
Rd 10 #225	Steve Halko - 	Hartford Whalers	(Thornhill Thunderbirds)

See also
 1992 Centennial Cup
 Dudley Hewitt Cup
 List of Ontario Hockey Association Junior A seasons
 Ontario Junior Hockey League
 Northern Ontario Junior Hockey League
 1991 in ice hockey
 1992 in ice hockey

References

External links
 Official website of the Ontario Junior Hockey League
 Official website of the Canadian Junior Hockey League

Metro Junior A Hockey League seasons
MetJHL